New Mexican Spanish refers to a variety of Spanish spoken in the United States in New Mexico and the southern part of the state of Colorado. It includes a Traditional dialect spoken generally by the Hispanos of New Mexico, descendants of colonists who arrived in New Mexico before its annexation by the US, in northern New Mexico and southern Colorado, and a Border dialect spoken in southern New Mexico. Despite a continual influence from Mexican Spanish to the south, New Mexico's unique political history and relative geographical and political isolation from the time of its annexation to the US have caused Traditional New Mexican Spanish to differ notably from the Spanish spoken in other parts of Hispanic America, with the exception of certain rural areas of Northern Mexico and Texas.

In recent years, the Traditional Spanish of northern New Mexico and southern Colorado has taken in more vocabulary from Mexican Spanish due to the increasing popularity of Spanish-language broadcast media in the US and intermarriage and interaction between Hispanos and Mexican immigrants, resulting in greater similarity between the Traditional and Border dialects. This new dialect has been called .

History 
The Spanish language first arrived in New Mexico with Juan de Oñate's colonization expedition in 1598, bringing 600-700 settlers. Almost half of the early settlers were from Spain, many from New Spain, the rest from "various parts of Latin America, the Canary Islands, Portugal, and so forth." Following the Pueblo Revolt in 1680, New Mexico was resettled again starting in 1692, primarily by refugees from the Pueblo Revolt and others born in northern New Spain. The Spanish-speaking areas with which New Mexico had the greatest contact were Chihuahua and Sonora. Likely as a result of these historical origins and connections, Traditional New Mexican Spanish shares many morphological features with the rural Spanish of Chihuahua, Sonora, Durango, and other parts of Mexico. Colonial New Mexico was very isolated and had widespread illiteracy, resulting in most New Mexicans having little to no exposure to "standard" Spanish. This linguistic isolation facilitated New Mexican Spanish's preservation of older vocabulary as well as its own innovations.

During that time, contact with the rest of Spanish America was limited because of the Comancheria, and New Mexican Spanish developed closer trading links to the Comanche than to the rest of New Spain. In the meantime, some Spanish colonists co-existed with and intermarried with Puebloan peoples and Navajos, also enemies of the Comanche.

Even during colonial times, New Mexican Spanish was not immune to change and as a result the Traditional New Mexican Spanish of the 20th and 21st centuries is not identical to the Spanish of the early colonial period. Rather, New Mexican Spanish evolved considerably, and this evolution is reflected in writing. After the Pueblo Revolt, New Mexico was re-settled with many new settlers coming in from central Mexico, in addition to returning New Mexican colonists. Also, the standard subjunctive form  and the nonstandard form  of the auxiliary verb  have always coexisted in New Mexican Spanish, but the prevalence of the nonstandard  increased significantly over the colonial period.

The presence of such deletion in areas close and historically connected to New Mexico makes it unlikely that New Mexicans independently developed this feature. Although colonial New Mexico had a very low rate of internal migration, trade connections with Chihuahua were strengthening during this time. Many of the people who moved into New Mexico were traders from Chihuahua, who became socially very prominent.

New Mexico's 1848 annexation by the US led to a greater exposure to English. Nevertheless, the late-19th-century development of a culture of print media allowed New Mexican Spanish to resist assimilation toward American English for many decades. The 1911 Encyclopædia Britannica, for instance, noted, "About one-tenth of the Spanish-American and Indian population [of New Mexico] habitually use the English language." At the beginning of the 20th century, there was an attempt by both Anglos and Hispanos to link New Mexico's history and language to Spain, rather than Mexico.

After 1917, Spanish usage in the public sphere began to decline and it was banned in schools, with students often being punished for speaking the language. This punishment was occasionally physical. Newspapers published in Spanish switched to English or went out of business. From then on, Spanish became a language of home and community. The advance of English-language broadcast media accelerated the decline. Since then, New Mexican Spanish has been undergoing a language shift, with Hispanos gradually shifting towards English. In addition, New Mexican Spanish faces pressure from Standard and Mexican Spanish. Younger generations tend to use more Anglicisms and Mexican and standard Spanish forms. The forms most characteristic of Traditional New Mexican Spanish, with few exceptions, are less likely to be found in the speech of young people. This is in part due to language attrition. The decline in Spanish exposure in the home creates a vacuum, into which "English and Mexican Spanish flow easily."

As of 2010, the Spanish variety of northern New Mexico, including Albuquerque, has been heavily influenced by Mexican Spanish, incorporating numerous Mexicanisms, while at the same time retaining some archaisms characteristic of traditional New Mexican Spanish. The use of Mexicanisms is most prominent in Albuquerque and Santa Fe, compared to other areas in the north. Some older Spanish speakers have noted Mexican immigrants showing surprise at non-immigrants speaking Spanish. In Albuquerque, the use of Mexicanisms correlates only with age, with younger speakers, regardless of their parents' background, being more likely to use Mexicanisms.

Geographic distribution 
New Mexican Spanish refers to the Spanish varieties spoken throughout the state of New Mexico and in the southern portion of Colorado. This label is applied to southern Colorado as well because Colorado was historically part of New Mexico until statehood in 1876 and because Spanish-speakers from New Mexico settled southern Colorado, resulting in most Spanish-speaking southern Coloradans having ancestry from New Mexico.

Dialects 
There are two main Spanish dialects in New Mexico and southern Colorado.
One is what Bills and Vigil call Traditional New Mexican Spanish (abbreviated TNMS), spoken in the northern and central parts of the region, whose speakers generally represent early colonial settlement. TNMS has been the subject of extensive study.
Despite TNMS' distinctiveness, it does fit into a Mexican "macro-dialect" due to its historical origins and features, and has been called "an offshoot of the Spanish of northern Mexico".
The other has been called Border Spanish, found in the southern third of New Mexico plus the Grants area in northwestern New Mexico and Crowley and Otero County, Colorado along the Arkansas River in southeastern Colorado. It is primarily the result of 20th-century Mexican immigration and whose speakers typically have closer contact with Mexican Spanish.
That said, some Border Spanish speakers have ancestry in the region dating back hundreds of years, at least.

Both of these varieties contain various sub-dialects, although the Traditional area has greater variation between different communities, and it also has high idiolectal variation within the same community. This variation is a consequence of both historical isolation and the modern language shift towards English.

The dialect boundary is an approximately east-west line running through Santa Fe. The  dialect includes a North Central dialect in the middle portion of the  dialect's area and a Northeastern dialect in its eastern portion. TNMS also has a less clear-cut West Central dialect centered around the southwest of Albuquerque.

There also exists regional phonological variation within TNMS. For example, syllable-initial -aspiration, while occurring throughout New Mexico and Southern Colorado, is particularly notable along the upper Rio Grande between Albuquerque and Taos.

Although the Spanish of Albuquerque has traditionally been considered part of the Traditional area, the high presence of Mexicanisms in Albuquerque Spanish has led some to consider it to constitute a third dialect zone, between Traditional and Border Spanish. In fact, the use of Mexicanisms is widespread across the Traditional Spanish zone, especially in Albuquerque and Santa Fe and especially among the younger generations.

Some diversity in Border Spanish is to be expected, given the continuous Hispanic presence in southern New Mexico since the colonial period, and the movement of some Traditional Spanish speakers to south of Las Cruces after the Mexican-American War. One sub-dialect of Border Spanish can be found in the southwestern corner of the state, including Doña Ana County and the areas to its west. This is the region closest to the border with Mexico. The southwestern sub-dialect is characterized by a number of lexical variants, all but one of which are typical of Mexican Spanish usage. For example, while most of New Mexico uses the term  for 'purse', and the  area north of Santa Fe uses , while the southwestern corner of New Mexico uses the standard . Also, southwestern New Mexico tends to use  for 'cracker', while the rest of New Mexico tends to use . Forms with  'cookie', such as  'salt cookie', are found throughout New Mexico.

Morphology 

That said, New Mexican Spanish, especially the Traditional variety, is known for a large number of nonstandard forms. Use of such forms is not universal, usually correlates negatively with education, and the most characteristic traits of Traditional New Mexican Spanish are generally more common among older speakers.

The following is a list of some characteristics of Traditional New Mexican Spanish's morphology, many of which are also found in Border Spanish: 

The second person preterite endings can be  or  instead of the standard . The  forms are found throughout the Spanish-speaking world, while the  forms are much more rare.
Use of older preterite forms such as:
This usage shows little regional patterning, being found in both Border Spanish and Traditional New Mexican Spanish. Instead, these nonstandard forms correlate negatively with exposure to standard Spanish and are less used by younger people.
This also shows little regional patterning.
The  stem is strongly associated with TNMS rather than border areas, and is more stigmatized than the regularized suffix .
 
Extension of vowel raising in those stem-changing verbs which already have it. Diphthongization in stressed positions is preserved. Examples:
, the standard first person present with diphthongization, is used in Traditional New Mexican Spanish.
This is common in non-standard Spanish varieties.
This appears to be a more recent development, as younger and less-educated speakers are more likely to use it. It's found across New Mexico and Southern Colorado.
This is widespread in colloquial Spanish.
This differs from the phonological trait where the s sound can be aspirated, or pronounced like an H, which is also present throughout New Mexico and southern Colorado.

Peculiar verb forms 
While many of the characteristics of Traditional New Mexican Spanish morphology are also characteristic of popular Spanish worldwide, some are more peculiar. All of these more peculiar verb forms are also found in rural Jalisco and Guanajuato, and some of these forms may also be found in Chihuahua, Durango, and Sonora, which were historically connected to New Mexico, as well as Tlaxcala.

These include:

 The second-person preterite forms  alongside the more widespread  and the standard 
Such a merger helps speakers to distinguish the present from the preterite. An example of this change would be  for 'we leave', from the  verb . A merger of the  verbs conjugations' into those of the  verbs is found in Chilote Spanish.

Also, although not part of verbal morphology, Traditional New Mexican Spanish often turns the clitic  into . This quite uncommon change is also found in Chilote Spanish, but not in rural Mexico.

Some of these forms were, until recently, present in major cities. This shows that social exclusion and marginalization, as well as geographical remoteness, can help to preserve such nonstandard forms.

All of these variants have been documented in rural areas of western Spain, such as in León, Salamanca, western Andalucia, and Extremadura, and they seem to have been more widespread in the past. These same western regions of Spain were also the origin of many conquistadors who settled the Americas and who may have brought these dialect traits to various regions. These features may also be widespread because of ease of acquisitions in contact situations. That is, if various speakers of different dialects come together in a single area, those grammatical forms which are easiest to acquire may become dominant over time. The prevalence of these forms in Judaeo-Spanish varieties seems to support that hypothesis, since Judaeo-Spanish varieties typically had much heavier input from eastern Ibero-Romance dialects.

English influence 
Many features of New Mexican Spanish are shared with the Spanish spoken throughout the United States, as a result of language contact with English. In expressions where use of the subjunctive mood is considered obligatory according to prescriptive grammar norms, New Mexicans with greater proficiency in Spanish and greater education in Spanish are more likely to actually use the subjunctive. However, it is worth noting that even in monolingual Spanish varieties, such as that of Mexico City, speakers do not always use the subjunctive mood in such supposedly obligatory situations.

Phonology 

The pronunciation of Spanish in New Mexico is generally "akin to that of northern Mexico", and shares the same general intonation patterns as northern Mexico. It shows the following general traits:

The following tendencies are common in Traditional New Mexican Spanish, though are not universal, and many are characteristic of Border Spanish or colloquial Spanish worldwide:

There is considerable variability in the pronunciation of Spanish rhotics in New Mexico. In addition to the realization of the tapped  as  before coronal consonants or after  and the replacement of the trilled  with a tap,  has found that in Taos  is often realized as a voiced apical fricative, transcribed .

Northern New Mexican Spanish, like other dialects, tends to avoid hiatus by combining or deleting vowels. Thus, 'I don't write', is pronounced . It has been suggested that this behavior may be explained by the initial  in these words being prosthetic, not present in their underlying representations. Thus, the vowel at the end of the preceding word fills in the vowel slot before  cluster, and no  needs to be added.

Traditional New Mexican Spanish has a number of syllabic consonants.
,  and  can also become syllabic before a sequence of  followed by a coronal consonant.

For many speakers of TNMS the syllabic  derived from  has acquired an epenthetic , becoming .

The vowel system in Albuquerque shows some influence from English, especially in the form of -fronting. While New Mexican Spanish lacks the strong vowel reduction and centralization characteristic of English, children from Albuquerque do realize their unstressed vowels in a smaller vowel space.

Vocabulary 

One of the most notable characteristics of Traditional New Mexican Spanish is its vocabulary. New Mexican Spanish has retained a lot of older vocabulary, or common vocabulary with older meanings, that has been lost in other Spanish varieties. This is one of the reasons it's often called "archaic". It's also developed a lot of vocabulary of its own, inherited many Nahuatl loanwords from Mexican Spanish, and taken in more loanwords from neighboring indigenous languages and from English.

Many of these terms are found in the colloquial speech of other regions as well.
The variant  is also occasionally used in northern New Mexico, but it is much less frequent than the other ways. 

TNMS has also retained many content words that have been lost in other varieties. For example, TNMS retains the word , meaning 'goose'.  is a feminine form of the term , which referred to wild geese, while  referred to the domesticated goose. That distinction seems to no longer be made, and  has become the typical term throughout most of the Spanish-speaking world. The term  is also retained in Zwolle-Ebarb Spanish.

Independent lexical innovations have occurred in TNMS. Also found in New Mexico is the standard term, and a  variant.  may be a retention of the original form, before metathesis switched the l and the g, or it may be a metathesized variant of the standard form.

While throughout the Spanish-speaking world,  means 'trout', throughout much of northern New Mexico and southern Colorado,  is used to refer to fish in general, instead of the standard  'caught fish' or  'live fish'. This extension is generally found in the areas north of, and including, Santa Fe and San Miguel County.

New Mexican Spanish, including both the Traditional and the Border varieties, has also regularized the gender of some nouns, such as  'language' and  "system". That is, many speakers treat them as feminine, even though they are normatively considered masculine nouns. Residents of Martineztown, Albuquerque in the early 80s viewed the feminine form, as slightly more correct than the traditional masculine. The regularization of feminine gender to nouns ending in -a has been expanding to younger generations.

After 1848, New Mexican Spanish has had to adopt or coin its own terms for new technological developments. One such development is the invention of the automobile. Like much of Latin America, New Mexico extended the meaning of  'cart' to include cars. Traditional New Mexican Spanish also ended up extending the term , which referred to driving animals, to include driving cars, although the standard  is most common across New Mexico and southern Colorado. This is the same solution that was chosen in English, and in the Zwolle-Ebarb dialect.
The word , a loanword for 'telephone', is also used across New Mexico and southern Colorado, with little geographical patterning, being found as far south as Las Cruces. More educated speakers tend to use the standard .

The word  'bear' is occasionally pronounced  in TNMS, with the nonstandard form being more common among old people.

Language contact 

New Mexican Spanish has been in contact with several indigenous American languages, most prominently those of the Pueblo and Navajo peoples with whom the Spaniards and Mexicans coexisted in colonial times. 
For centuries, Hispanics had hostile relations with the Navajo and other nomadic peoples, such as the Apache.
The term , referring to the Gila Apache, is cited as a loan from an Apache language.
In the opposite direction, Navajo, which typically doesn't adopt many loanwords, has borrowed some terms from Spanish as well. For example, the Navajo terms for "money" and "Anglo" are borrowings from Spanish  and  respectively.

Hispanic contact with the Puebloans was much closer, though linguistic contact was somewhat uneven. Most of the bilinguals who mediated between Hispanics and Puebloans were themselves Puebloans since few Hispanics spoke a Pueblo language. As a result, Puebloan languages borrowed many words from Spanish, while New Mexican Spanish borrowed fewer words from Pueblo languages.
For an example of loanword phonological borrowing in Taos, see Taos loanword phonology.

Most Puebloan loanwords in New Mexican Spanish have to do with people and place names, cultural artifacts, foods, and plants and herbs.
One such loan is the term , which comes from either a Zuni word for "bits of ground corn or cornmeal used for ceremonial purposes" or a Rio Grande Tewa term for grains of corn. It's most commonly used to mean "coffee grounds". This usage is also attested in northern Chihuahua. It's also used to mean "crumbs" by speakers from south-western New Mexico, although speakers elsewhere prefer the standard . 

New Mexico came into contact with the French language in the early 18th century due to interactions with French Fur trappers and traders. These interactions increased after Mexican independence. Some family names, such as Archibeque, Gurulé, and Tixier, are attributable to French influence.
The only other Spanish variety where  is used is the Brule variety of Isleño Spanish, which has been greatly influenced by French. 
The term  is also used in New Mexico for "slipper", but it's associated with the border region, and is widely used across Latin America and Spain.

New Mexican Spanish has also been in substantial contact with American English. The contact with American English began before the Mexican–American War, when New Mexico did trade with the US, and increased after New Mexico's annexation by the US. One effect of this is semantic extension, using Spanish words with the meaning of their English cognates, such as using  to mean "to realize." Contact with English has also led to a general adoption of many loanwords, as well as a language shift towards English with abandonment of Spanish.

Legal status 
New Mexico law accommodates the use of Spanish. For instance, constitutional amendments must be approved by referendum and must be printed on the ballot in both English and Spanish. Certain legal notices must be published in English and Spanish, and the state maintains a list of newspapers for Spanish publication. Spanish was not used officially in the legislature after 1935.

Though the New Mexico Constitution (1912) provided that laws would be published in both languages for 20 years and that practice was renewed several times, it ceased in 1949. Accordingly, some describe New Mexico as officially bilingual. Others disagree and say that New Mexico's laws were designed to facilitate a transition from Spanish to English, not to protect Spanish or give it any official status.

See also 

 Spanish language in the United States
 Hispanos of New Mexico
 Hispanics and Latinos in New Mexico 
 New Mexican English

Notes

References

Sources 

 
 
 
 
 
 
 
 
 
 
 
 
 
 
 
 
 
 
 
 
 
 

Spanish dialects of North America
Spanish-American culture in Colorado
Spanish-American culture in New Mexico
Spanish language in the United States
History of New Mexico
Languages of New Mexico